Dennis McAleer Kearns (born September 27, 1945) is a Canadian former professional ice hockey defenceman who spent his entire career with the Vancouver Canucks of the National Hockey League. He is the cousin of Shawn Evans.

Playing career
His rights being held by the Chicago Black Hawks, Kearns served a four-year apprentice in the minor leagues, principally with the Portland Buckaroos of the Western Hockey League. Between the 1969 and 1971 seasons, Kearns was a First or Second Team league All-Star all three years.

In the summer of 1971, Chicago - then being deep on defence, behind perennial All-Stars Pat Stapleton and Bill White - exposed Kearns in the Intra-League Draft, and he was claimed by Vancouver, for whom he made his NHL debut that fall. Kearns would play his next ten years in Vancouver, his entire NHL career, becoming a star playmaker with noteworthy skill on offense and the power play despite his small size for a defenceman. His best years were between 1976 and 1978, when having recovered from injuries the previous two years he averaged nearly fifty assists a season, was named to the Canadian national team at the World Championships twice, and was called by The Hockey News the "Denis Potvin of the West." Unfortunately, his feats on the ice never translated to success in the playoffs; during his career Kearns played in only eleven playoff games, and the Canucks won only three playoff matches in his tenure.

His production declined sharply after the 1979 season, and no longer a frontline defenceman as the team moved younger players into prominence, retired after the 1981 season.

International career
Kearns was a member of Team Canada at the 1977 and 1978 World Ice Hockey Championships.

Retirement
Kearns finished his career with 31 goals and 290 assists for 321 points in 677 games, adding 386 penalty minutes. His 55 assists in 1977 remains the franchise record for defencemen [surpassed by Quinn Hughes in the 2021-22 season with 60 assists]. His 321 career points was the all-time mark for Canucks defencemen for over three decades until surpassed by Mattias Öhlund at the end of the 2009 season. His 290 career assists stood as the franchise record for defenceman until being overtaken by Alexander Edler in 2020.

In retirement, he and his family live in Vancouver, where he owns an insurance business. His son, Bracken Kearns, also played hockey professionally with the Florida Panthers, San Jose Sharks, and New York Islanders before retiring in 2019.

Career statistics

Regular season and playoffs

International

References

External links

1945 births
Living people
Canada men's national ice hockey team players
Canadian ice hockey defencemen
Dallas Black Hawks players
Ice hockey people from Ontario
Sportspeople from Kingston, Ontario
Portland Buckaroos players
Vancouver Canucks players